Maria Le Hardouin (née, Sabine d'Outhoorn; 1912, Geneva – 24 May 1967, Paris) was a Swiss French-speaking writer and woman of letters. She was awarded the Prix Femina in 1949 for her novel La Dame de cœur.

Works 
 1941: Dialogue à un seul personnage
 1942: Journal de la jalousie
 1943: La Voile noire
 1944: Samson ou le Héros des temps futurs
 1944: Celui qui n'était pas un héros
 1947: L'Étoile absinthe
 1948: Colette, une biographie
 1949: La Dame de cœur, Prix Femina
 1951: Les Amours parallèles
 1956: Colette
 1956: Recherche d'une éternité
 1961: À la mémoire d'un homme
 1962: Rimbaud le transfuge...

External links 
 Maria Le Hardouin on Babelio
 List of books on Amazon

20th-century Swiss writers
Prix Femina winners
1912 births
1967 deaths
20th-century Swiss women writers
Writers from Geneva
Swiss writers in French